John Carrier Weaver (May 21, 1915 – March 10, 1995) was an American professor of geography, and college administrator for several major universities in the  United States.

Early life
Weaver was born in Evanston, Illinois. His father, A. T. Weaver, was a professor of speech and theater at the University of Wisconsin–Madison from 1918 to 1961. John Weaver graduated from the University of Wisconsin High School, then received his A.B. (1936), A.M. (1937), and Ph.D. (1942), all in geography, from the University of Wisconsin. He was a member of the Chi Phi Fraternity.

Military service
He was on the staff of the American Geographical Society from 1940 to 1942, was a researcher for the Division of Geography and Cartography of the United States Department of State from 1942 to 1944, and from 1944 to 1946 served as an Arctic intelligence officer in the Navy.

Research
Weaver's PhD provided a statistical analysis of US barley production (published as a paper 1943). While his later work provided a widely used method of defining agricultural regions (1954).

Career in higher education
Weaver taught geography at the University of Minnesota from 1946 to 1955; became dean of the College of Arts and Science at Kansas State University (1955–1957); then dean of the Graduate College at the University of Nebraska (1957–1961), vice president for research, and dean of the Graduate College at the University of Iowa (1961–1964); and vice president for academic affairs at The Ohio State University (1964–1966). From 1966 to 1970, Weaver served as president of the University of Missouri System. In 1970, the regents of the University of Wisconsin elected Weaver president, and he took office in January 1971; when the University of Wisconsin System was created in October 1971, Weaver became its first president. Weaver retired from the UW System in June, 1977, and moved to Los Angeles where he was a Distinguished Professor of Geography at the University of Southern California and the first executive director of the Annenberg Center for the Study of the American Experience. He died in Rancho Palos Verdes, California.

Selected publications
 Weaver, J. C. (1943). Climatic relations of American barley production. Geographical Review, 33(4), 569-588.
 Weaver, J. C. (1954). Crop-combination regions in the Middle West. Geographical Review, 44(2), 175-200.

Academic Offices

References

1915 births
1995 deaths
American geographers
Science teachers
University of Wisconsin–Madison College of Letters and Science alumni
Leaders of the University of Wisconsin-Madison
People from Evanston, Illinois
Scientists from Madison, Wisconsin
Presidents of the University of Missouri System
Presidents of the University of Wisconsin System
University of Minnesota faculty
Kansas State University faculty
University of Iowa faculty
University of Nebraska faculty
Ohio State University faculty
20th-century geographers
United States Navy personnel of World War II
20th-century American academics